HMAS Sydney was a Chatham-class light cruiser of the Royal Australian Navy (RAN). Laid down in 1911 and launched in 1912, the cruiser was commissioned into the RAN in 1913.

During the early stages of World War I, Sydney was involved in supporting the Australian Naval and Military Expeditionary Force, and escorting the first ANZAC convoy. On 9 November 1914, she defeated the German cruiser  at the Battle of Cocos. During 1915 and 1916, Sydney operated on the North America and West Indies Station, before joining the 2nd Light Cruiser Squadron at Greenock, Scotland in November 1916. On 4 May 1917, the cruiser was involved in an inconclusive action against the German zeppelin L43; neither was damaged. During late 1917, Sydney became the first Australian warship to launch an aircraft, and the first warship to do so from a rotatable platform.

After the war's end, Sydney spent a year in reserve before being reactivated to serve as Flagship of the RAN. The cruiser was decommissioned in 1928 and broken up for scrap. Several sections of the ship, including her bow and foremast, have been preserved as monuments, and three of the ship's main guns saw later use in shore fortifications.

Design and construction
Sydney was a Town class light cruiser, of the Chatham subclass. She had a standard displacement of 5,400 tons. Coal- and oil-fuelled Yarrow boilers were connected to Parsons geared turbines, which provided  shaft horsepower to the ship's four propellers. The standard ship's company was 376 strong, but during wartime, this would increase to the maximum of 475; 31 officers and 454 sailors.

The cruiser's main armament was made up of eight single BL 6-inch Mark XI guns. Secondary and anti-aircraft armament consisted of a single  quick-firing high-angle anti-aircraft gun and ten 0.303-inch machine guns (eight Lewis guns and two Maxim guns). Two 21-inch torpedo tubes were fitted, with a payload of seven torpedoes carried. Two hydraulic-release depth charge chutes were carried for anti-submarine warfare. A single 12-pounder 8-cwt field gun and four 3-pounder Hotchkiss saluting guns rounded out the armament.

Sydney was laid down by the London and Glasgow Engineering and Iron Shipbuilding Company at Glasgow, Scotland, on 11 February 1911. The ship was launched on 29 August 1912 by the wife of Admiral Sir Reginald Henderson. Sydney was completed on 26 June 1913, and commissioned into the RAN that day. The ship cost approximately 385,000 pounds to build.

Operational history

Early career and initial war operations

Sydney arrived in Albany, Western Australia on 19 September 1913, after completing her maiden voyage. The three vessels reached Sydney in May, and the cruiser was reassigned to patrols along the eastern coast.

When World War I started, Sydney was north-bound to join Admiral George Patey and the battlecruiser . The ships were quickly assigned to protect the Australian Naval and Military Expeditionary Force, which was used to capture German colonial assets in the region; Sydney participated in operations against Rabaul and Anguar Island in September. In October, Sydney and sister ship  left Patey's squadron for Sydney, where they joined the escort of the first convoy delivering Australian and New Zealand soldiers to Egypt. The convoy sailed around the southern coast of Australia to Albany, then departed on 1 November for Colombo.

Battle of Cocos

On the morning of 9 November, the communications station at Direction Island, in the Cocos (Keeling) Islands group, was captured by the German light cruiser . Before capture, the station was able to transmit an SOS, which was received by the troop convoy, and Sydney was ordered to investigate. Emdens wireless operators had overheard the distress call and the orders to Sydney, and prepared to meet the Australian warship.

The Australian warship was able to fire for effect after two salvos, destroying Emdens three funnels, foremast, wireless and steering gear, and setting the engine room on fire. The German ship beached herself on North Keeling Island, and Sydney went after the supporting collier Buresk, but the ship had already commenced scuttling, and the Australian warship returned to Emden. The Germans were still flying their war ensign, but pulled it down after Sydney transmitted an instruction to surrender, then fired two salvos when no response was forthcoming.

In the course of the engagement, Sydney had fired some 670 rounds of ammunition, with around 100 hits claimed. She had meanwhile been hit sixteen times; three of her crew were killed and thirteen were wounded. 134 German personnel were killed, with the rest of the ship's company were captured by Sydney (apart from a shore party, which commandeered the schooner Ayesha and escaped) and were delivered to British forces at Valletta, Malta. After leaving Malta, the Australian cruiser proceeded to join the North America and West Indies Station, arriving in Bermuda on 6 January 1915.

Atlantic Ocean
Sydney spent eighteen months uneventfully patrolling along the west coast of the Americas. On 9 September 1916, the cruiser sailed for the United Kingdom, and after a brief refit in Greenock, joined the 5th Battle Squadron at Scapa Flow. On 15 November, Sydney was reassigned to the 2nd Light Cruiser Squadron at Greenock.

The airship dropped 10 to 12 bombs towards Sydney which failed to hit the ship (although the airship claimed to have hit one of the cruisers; the first air attack on an Australian warship. The Zeppelin was driven off by anti-aircraft fire.

In August 1917, Sydney docked at Chatham for a three-month refit. During this, was fitted with a new tripod mast and a revolving aircraft launch platform; the first fitted to any warship. On 8 December, after acquiring a Sopwith Pup aircraft from sister ship , Sydney became the first RAN vessel to launch an aircraft. On 17 December, the Pup was launched again, this time with the ramp rotated to face into the wind; the first launch of an aircraft from a ship-mounted rotating platform. The Pup was replaced by a Sopwith Camel in early 1918. On 1 June 1918, the aircraft was launched for its only combat sortie, after two German aircraft were spotted while Sydney and the rest of the 2nd Light Cruiser Squadron were heading to Heligoland Bight for a raid. Unable to locate Sydney, the pilot ditched near the destroyer .

The Australian cruiser was present at the surrender of the German High Seas Fleet on 21 November 1918, and was assigned to escort another Emden, the Königsberg-class cruiser named to honour Sydneys opponent at the Battle of Cocos. Sydney left England for home in April 1919. Initially, the cruiser only received one battle honour, "Emden 1914", for her wartime service; this was one of only three single-ship action honours awarded during the 20th century. Following an overhaul of the RAN honours system in 2010, Sydney was retroactively awarded two more battle honours: "Rabaul 1914" and "North Sea 1917–18".

Post-war
Sydney was paid off into reserve on 13 April 1923. Following a refit, she was recommissioned on 29 September 1924 to serve as Flagship of the RAN.

Decommissioning and fate

Sydney paid off at Sydney on 8 May 1928 and arrived at the Cockatoo Island Dockyard in 1929, where she was broken up. The ship's foremast was retained, and in 1934, it was erected at Bradleys Head by the floating crane Titan. This initially served as a monument to the engagement against Emden, but was rededicated in 1964 as a monument for all Australian ships lost and all sailors killed in the line of duty. Part of the bow, including the stem head, jackstaff, and fairleads, was set into the seawall at Milsons Point, under the Sydney Harbour Bridge. One of the cruiser's derricks is on display in the Victory Memorial Gardens in Wagga Wagga, New South Wales, and a compass stand is located at Port Macquarie, New South Wales. The main top-mast was erected at Environa, New South Wales, but rotted at the base and collapsed. It was later moved to Jervis Bay.

During the 1930s, two of the 6-inch guns were transported to Western Australia, and in 1938 were installed at Buckley Point on Rottnest Island. These were withdrawn from service and placed in storage in 1944, then were sold to a scrap merchant in 1963. However, the dealer never collected them, and the guns remained on site until 1980, when army reservists retrieved and refurbished them, with one on display outside the Army Museum of Western Australia. Another of the ship's guns was used on Thursday Island from 1940 to 1987.

In 2014 a shield removed from HMAS Adelaide during a refit in 1943 and dumped on a tip on the Mornington Peninsula, Victoria, was transported to Perth for refurbishment. A member of the Royal Australian Artillery Historical Society of Western Australia, which had been searching for such a shield for 20 years as a match for a 6-inch Mk XI naval gun it held from HMAS Sydney had spotted the shield at location. The naval gun and shield were installed at the Leighton Battery in September 2015 to replicate the original 6-inch guns at site.

See also

HMAS Sydney I - SMS Emden Memorial

Notes

References

Further reading

External links

 Australian War Memorial (AWM): Unofficial "Sydney Emden Medal"
  oldWeather.org transcription of ship's logbooks June 1913 to June 1914

Town-class cruisers (1910) of the Royal Australian Navy
Ships built in Govan
1912 ships
World War I cruisers of Australia
Sydney Harbour National Park